The Monoblastiaceae are a family of lichen-forming fungi in the monotypic order Monoblastiales. It contains six genera. The family was circumscribed in 1929 by British botanist William Watson.

Genera
Acrocordia  – 6 spp.
Anisomeridium  – ca. 80 spp.
Caprettia  – 8 spp.
Megalotremis  – 12 spp.
Monoblastia  – 11 spp.
Trypetheliopsis  – 6 spp.

References

Dothideomycetes
Dothideomycetes families
Lichen families
Taxa described in 1929
Taxa named by William Watson (botanist)